The Pauline Chapel is a chapel on the National Register of Historic Places owned by The Broadmoor resort. It was built in 1919. The Chapel was not dedicated as a Catholic church until 1925. In 1918, Spencer Penrose submitted two designs for the chapel. The second was chosen.

References

Churches on the National Register of Historic Places in Colorado
Colorado State Register of Historic Properties
Churches in Colorado Springs, Colorado
National Register of Historic Places in Colorado Springs, Colorado
Roman Catholic chapels in the United States
Churches in El Paso County, Colorado
Churches in Colorado
Churches completed in 1919
1919 establishments in Colorado